Jerome K. Moore was born in Kittery, Maine and is an artist best known for his work on various Star Trek comics at publishers across the comic industry.

Biography 
Born in Kittery, Maine to William and Maxine, Moore was raised in New York City with his four siblings after their father completed his service in the United States Air Force.   William Moore Jr. had a career as a professional illustrator at J. Walter Thompson ad agency.  Jerome emulated his father by enrolling at Art & Design High School in Manhattan (which was called the School of Industrial Arts when his father attended).  Moore majored in Cartooning, receiving special notices and awards in excellence, and, shortly after graduating, he embarked on a professional career at DC Comics.  It was soon after this that William uprooted the family, moving everyone to Southern California.  Moore continued to freelance for various comic book companies. Moore is best known for his cover designs for DC Comics' Star Trek and Star Trek: The Next Generation titles, as well as for Malibu Comics' Star Trek: Deep Space Nine, and Innovation Comics' Lost In Space.

Moore was less active in comics for a span of time when he worked for Warner Bros.' marketing division where, as a Senior Character Artist, he handled style guide programs for such diverse properties as Looney Tunes, Scooby-Doo, Tom and Jerry, and The Wizard of Oz, along with assignments on animated feature films such as The Quest for Camelot, The Iron Giant, Osmosis Jones, and Happy Feet, as well as live-action films such as Speed Racer, and the Harry Potter franchise.

Moore has also worked in animation at Marvel/Lionsgate and Warner Bros. He assisted on character design for Planet Hulk, "Justice League: Crisis on Two Earths," and "Green Lantern: Emerald Knights."  He is a part of the creative team behind the "Young Justice" series airing on Cartoon Network.

References

External links
 Jerome K. Moore at deviantArt

American comics artists
Living people
Year of birth missing (living people)

https://www.imdb.com/name/nm5252795/?ref_=nv_sr_1